Aitor Fernández may refer to:
Aitor Fernández (footballer, born 1986), Spanish footballer
Aitor Fernández (footballer, born 1991), Spanish footballer